Tanyidamani was a Kushite king of Meroë who ruled around 100 BCE.

He was most liklely the son of king Adikhalamani and Nahirqo.
He is known by some objects, the most remarkable among these is a large stele from Jebel Barkal: it is the first long-known text in Meroitic alphabet. Another smaller, red siltstone stele was found in the temple of Apedemak at Meroë, and is now at the Walters Art Museum.

On a bronze cylinder found at Jebel Barkal both his throne name and personal name are given in Hieroglyphics, but these are identical: Tanyidamani. The Meroitic inscriptions only mention one name and it seems that the original Egyptian royal titulary composed of five names was apparently abandoned with the introduction of the Meroitic language and alphabet. The only term used in this simplified titulary is Qore which probably means “king”.
No pyramid could be assigned to him.

References

2nd-century BC monarchs of Kush
1st-century BC monarchs of Kush
2nd-century BC rulers
1st-century BC rulers